Flexible specialization may refer to:
 Flexible Specialization (Post-Fordism), a name given to the dominant system of economic production, consumption and associated socio-economic phenomena, in most industrialized countries since the late 20th century
 Network governance, also known as Flexible Specialization